Elisabeth Sussman is an American art curator. She currently works at the Sondra Gilman Curator of Photography at the Whitney Museum of American Art. In 2013 she was awarded the Audrey Irmas Award for Curatorial Excellence from The Center for Curatorial Studies at Bard College, in recognition of her 40-year career as a groundbreaking curator.

References

Living people
American art curators
American women curators
People associated with the Whitney Museum of American Art
Year of birth missing (living people)
21st-century American women